Benedetta Ponticelli (born 22 December 1979 in Siena) is an Italian voice actress. She contributes to voicing characters in anime, cartoons, sitcoms, films, video games, and more content.

Ponticelli provides the voice of Carly Shay in the Italian-language version of Nickelodeon original sitcom iCarly. She also voiced Tenma Tsukomato in the anime series School Rumble. In addition she does Applejack and Fluttershy in My Little Pony: Friendship Is Magic. Also, she is the new Italian voice of Lara Croft.

Ponticelli works at Merak Film, Studio P.V., Studio Asci and other dubbing studios in Italy.

Voice work

Video games
 Sylvie Leroux in Chronicles of Mystery: The Scorpio Ritual
 Cristina Vespucci in Assassin's Creed II and Assassin's Creed: Brotherhood
 Lara Croft in Tomb Raider , Rise of the Tomb Raider , Shadow of the Tomb Raider
 Miles "Tails" Prower since Sonic Generations
 Leah in Diablo III

Anime and animation
 Tenma Tsukomato in School Rumble
 Alphonse Elric in Fullmetal Alchemist, Fullmetal Alchemist the Movie: Conqueror of Shamballa and Fullmetal Alchemist: Brotherhood
 Jimmy Neutron in The Adventures of Jimmy Neutron: Boy Genius
 Nick in The Cat in the Hat Knows a Lot About That!
 Island Owl in Animal Mechanicals
 Yuki Cross in Vampire Knight and Vampire Knight Guilty
 Urié in Angel's Friends
 Applejack and Fluttershy in My Little Pony: Friendship Is Magic
 Reiha in Vampire Princess Miyu
 Aramis in The Three Musketeers (1987 TV series), Aria the Animation, Aria the Natural, 'Aria the Origination Issa in Animal Yokochō Ilse Burnley in Kaze no Shoujo Emily Loki (child form) in The Mythical Detective Loki Ragnarok Doris in Terkel in Trouble Magma in X-Men: Evolution Aya Hasebe in Comic Party Alison in Cosmic Quantum Ray Biff Robinson in The Magic Key Ondino in Ondino
 Roary in Roary the Racing Car Dear Daniel in The Adventures of Hello Kitty & Friends Uta Yumeno in Onegai My Melody Inori Yamabuki/Cure Pine in Fresh Pretty Cure! May Jessica in Sol Bianca: The Legacy Lady Clarisse d'Cagliostro in The Castle of Cagliostro (3rd dub)
 Valentine de Villefort in Gankutsuou: The Count of Monte Cristo Anna Aoi/Anna Saruwatari in Godannar Anna Rochefort in Le Chevalier D'Eon Tio in Fushigiboshi no Futagohime Ellie Martin/Elastika in Zevo-3 Snap in ChalkZoneLive action
 Carly Shay in iCarly Rose Hall-Smith in McLeod's Daughters Eva in Frontier(s) Tammi in Thief (TV miniseries)             
 Callie in True Jackson, VP Hotarubi in Shinobi: Heart Under Blade Mieke Fonkel/Mega Mindy in Mega Mindy Emily Kmetko in Make It or Break It''

References

External links
 

1979 births
Living people
People from Siena
Italian voice actresses